He Yinli (born 20 July 1988 in Baotou, Inner Mongolia) is a female Chinese long-distance runner. She competed in the marathon event at the 2015 World Championships in Athletics in Beijing, China.

See also
 China at the 2015 World Championships in Athletics

References

External links
 

Chinese female long-distance runners
Living people
Place of birth missing (living people)
1988 births
World Athletics Championships athletes for China
Athletes (track and field) at the 2014 Asian Games
Asian Games competitors for China
People from Baotou
Runners from Inner Mongolia
21st-century Chinese women